Thomas Hodges (born 3 April 1957) is a modern-day British artist, working primarily with photography, and is best known for his nude-art work.

Life
Hodges was born in the South London suburb of Woolwich. His father was an amateur photographer and he developed an early interest in photography. Hodges has travelled throughout Europe, spending many years living in France and moving to Italy in 2007, where he currently resides. He has also lived throughout East and Southeast Asia, residing in Malaysia, Hong Kong and China.

Career
Hodges worked in the investment banking industry in development finance for sustainable and socially responsible projects. In 1984, he started working as a part-time photographer, shooting back-stage during major fashion shows.  From 1995 to 2000, while residing in Malaysia, he stopped photography completely. He resigned from the investment banking business in 2000 and decided to pursue a full-time career as an artist, working primarily with photography. Hodges is a member of the UK based Association of Erotic Artists.
Hodges has seen his art work displayed in public spaces in Berlin on a pillar in conjunction with the arts company Art Below.

Inspirations
Hodges specialises in photographing the sexuality of woman. He is inspired by female beauty and lists Gustav Klimt, Egon Schiele, Edgar Degas, Auguste Rodin, Gustave Courbet, Man Ray and Helmut Newton as significant inspirations to his work.

Style and technique
Hodges terms much of his work as "Imaginistic", which he defines as "leaving the onlooker to deduct the ultimate conclusion of what his images portray". Although he has experience working in studios, he prefers available light.  He believes that he excels in the manipulation and control of light, frequently working at the extremes of both high-key and low-key photography.

Awards
In 2006, Hodges was awarded the title of "Spider Fellow", having won a Nominee Award in the "Black and White Spider Awards". The Spider Awards are for excellence in black and white photography". Hodges was further honored in 2007, when he won a further five Nominee Awards in the 3rd competition. Hodges has also won "Nominee Awards" in the 2006, 2008 and 2009 International Color Awards’ "Photography Masters Cup". Hodges also received an "Honorable Mention" award in the 2008 and 2009 IPA-Lucie Awards in the Fine Art Nude category, for his series "Romantica" and "Nude Shadows". In 2009, Hodges was also a winner in the London International Creative Competition (LICC), for his art nude series "Wrapped".

Publication
Hodges’ work has been published in print and online, including Playboy, GQ, Erotic Review, Met Art, The Photo Paper, The Photography Masters Cup 2008 Yearbook, The World's Greatest Black & White Photography, Volume 1, The Artists Diary, Lux Gallery Magazine, What's Up magazine and the British Museum of Erotic Art.

In 2009, Hodges was also spotlighted as a "Featured Member" by The Lucie Foundation.

Hodges has several book publications, including his monograph Imaginism and an erotic novel, with M. Christian.

Exhibitions
Hodges exhibits his work internationally, including The Italian Cultural Institute, London, the London Underground, The streets of Berlin, the 2008 Venice Biennale, the 2008 Poster Show in New York City and the 2009 International Art Show in Cannes.

Public collections
Hodges’ works can be found in both private and public collections worldwide, including Shanghai University and Chi Mei Museum.

References

External links
TVN interview at the Art Show Cannes
One art world

1957 births
Living people
Photographers from London
British erotic photographers